Mamadou Ndioko Niass (born 4 June 1994) is a Mauritanian professional footballer who plays as a forward for El Entag El Harby SC in Egypt and the Mauritania national team.

International career

International goals
Scores and results list Mauritania's goal tally first.

References

External links 
 
 

1994 births
Living people
Mauritanian footballers
Mauritanian expatriate footballers
Association football forwards
Mauritania international footballers
FC Nouadhibou players
Salam Zgharta FC players
El Entag El Harby SC players
Lebanese Premier League players
Egyptian Premier League players
Expatriate footballers in Lebanon
Expatriate footballers in Egypt
Mauritanian expatriate sportspeople in Egypt
Mauritanian expatriate sportspeople in Lebanon